Anthony Cormier is an American journalist with BuzzFeed News, and formerly with the Tampa Bay Times and the Sarasota Herald-Tribune. Cormier was a co-recipient of the 2016 Pulitzer Prize for Investigative Reporting.

Early life
Cormier graduated from Florida State University in 2000 with a degree in creative writing.

Career
Working at the Sarasota Herald-Tribune, Cormier and Matt Doug exposed how Florida police officers with multiple complaints and crimes were able to keep their jobs. Their series of reports, "Unfit for Duty", earned them the 2011 "Print/Online – Small" award from Investigative Reporters and Editors (IRE), and the Herald-Tribune the 2012 EPPY award for Best Investigative/Enterprise Feature on a Website with under 1 million unique monthly visitors.

His investigative work with Michael Braga led to a series of reports on how Florida bankers illegally looted their banks during the real estate boom. The series, "Breaking the Banks", led to lawsuits by the Federal Deposit Insurance Corporation and indictments against three bankers. Cormier and Braga received the 2013 "Print/Online – Small" award for the series from IRE, and the 2013 Best in Business award from the Society for Advancing Business Editing and Writing.

Cormier joined the Tampa Bay Times in 2015. Cormier received the 2016 Pulitzer Prize for Investigative Reporting together with Leonora LaPeter Anton, also of the Times, and Braga, who was still with the Sarasota Hearald-Tribune. Their series of reports, "Insane. Invisible. In danger.", detailed the devastating effects of recurring deep budget cuts in the Florida mental health system. The fallout from the series led to an increase in state appropriations and new legislation aimed at fixing systemic problems.

Cormier earned the 2017 Gerald Loeb Award for Investigative business journalism for "Allegiant Air".

Cormier joined the BuzzFeed News Investigative Unit in early 2017.

Controversies 
On 18 January 2019, Cormier co-authored an explosive report that alleged Donald Trump directed his personal lawyer Michael D. Cohen to lie to Congress about the Moscow tower project, a construction deal at the heart of an investigation by the special counsel Robert Mueller. The report attracted attention because such an action by Trump would constitute a felony. Democratic congressmen publicly mused impeachment.

The report came under scrutiny, however, after Mueller broke precedent by issuing a denial and other news organisations were unable to corroborate the findings with reports of their own.

On April 5, 2019, Cormier co-authored a story that was presented as an update to the January 2019 story. The April story referenced a 12-page memo submitted by Cohen's legal counsel to Congress that said President Trump "encouraged Cohen to lie and say all Moscow Tower project contacts ended as of January 31, 2016 using 'code' language." Subsequently, on April 18, 2019, the original Cohen report was updated to state that the "Mueller report found that Trump did not direct Michael Cohen to lie."

References

External links
 "Breaking the Banks", winner of the 2013 Investigative Reporters and Editors award for Print/Online – Small
 "Insane. Invisible. In danger." winner of the 2016 Pulitzer Prize for Investigative Reporting
Anthony Cormier | BuzzFeed News Profile

American newspaper writers
Florida State University alumni
Living people
Pulitzer Prize for Investigative Reporting winners
Year of birth missing (living people)
Place of birth missing (living people)
Gerald Loeb Award winners for Investigative